Masterok (also spelled "Masterock") is a children's music band from Dnipro, Ukraine. Founded in 1975 by composer, arranger, musician Mikhail Nekrich, the band had numerous members (age 5-14) who contributed their young talents towards its success. 
Masterok had countless TV and live appearances all over the world, as well as 5 vinyl LP records and 4 CD albums releases. The band always featured strong vocals, keyboards, guitars, woodwinds, bass, drums & percussion. Always performing live, the young members had a commitment to formal music training as well as an extensive touring and studio work schedule. 
Many former members have chosen the fields of music and art as their careers.

Milestones of Masterok's career
1975 M. Nekrich holds first auditions for the band and discovers its first young stars
1986 Russian giant Melodiya releases band's second LP "Funny Collection"
1986 International Song Festival in Siedlce 
1986 the band was chosen to stay and perform in Artek
1986 International Rock Festival in Kiev
2005 Atlantic releases Masterok's Christmas album "Rejoice To Christ’s Birth!"

Former members (incomplete list)
Andrey Romaniy - vocals
Marina Kuleba - vocals, guitar
Alexandr Levin - bass, vocals
Svetlana Varjel - keyboards, vocals
Elena Kuznetsova - keyboards, vocals
Vitaly Shapovalov - keyboards, vocals
Natalia Karyaka - keyboards, vocals
Anastasia Biretz - keyboards, vocals
Dmitri Rotmistrovsky - flute, vocals 
Yuri Ptashnikov - flute, drums, vocals 
Victoria Sevastianova - keyboards, vocals
Olga Ishenko - bass 
Irina Spas'ko - vocals, guitar
Vitaly Sedunov - vibraphone, drums, vocals 
Konstantin Diduch - guitar
Dmitri Bolotov - guitar
Vladimir "Shmaga" Rechtman - drums, vocals 
Anton Skhorochodov - drums, vocals 
Alyona Levin - vocals, keyboards
Elena Kuznetsova Jr - keyboards, vocals
Evgeny Kuchtin - bass
Victoria Brekhar - vocals
Alexandr Parubets - vocals
Zhanneta Nekrich-Lopez - keyboard
George Nekrich - violin, vocal

Other professionals associated with the band
Natalia Nekrich - répétiteur
Boris Kaptselovich - sound
Boris Glizer - theatrical director 
George Nekrich - music director

Child musical groups
Folk rock groups
Musical collectives
Ukrainian pop music groups